Mount Vernon Downtown Historic District is a national historic district located at Mount Vernon, Posey County, Indiana.  The district encompasses 39 contributing buildings, 2 contributing sites, 1 contributing structure, and 2 contributing objects in the central business district of Mount Vernon.  It developed between about 1850 and 1953, and includes notable examples of Italianate, Queen Anne, Romanesque Revival, and Classical Revival style architecture. Located in the district is the separately listed Posey County Courthouse Square.  Other notable contributing resources include the McFadin Cemetery, Sherburne Park, the Armory (1922), the Alexandrian (Carnegie) Library (1905), City Hall (1893), Fogas Building (1880), Eagles Home (1917), Palace Soda Shop, Memorial Coliseum (1925), and the Opera House (1879).

It was listed on the National Register of Historic Places in 2003.

References

External links

Mount Vernon, Indiana
Historic districts on the National Register of Historic Places in Indiana
Romanesque Revival architecture in Indiana
Italianate architecture in Indiana
Queen Anne architecture in Indiana
Neoclassical architecture in Indiana
Historic districts in Posey County, Indiana
National Register of Historic Places in Posey County, Indiana